Alphaea rothschildi is a moth of the family Erebidae. It was described by Vladimir Viktorovitch Dubatolov and Yasunori Kishida in 2005. It is found in the Indian states of Assam and Sikkim.

References

Moths described in 2005
Spilosomina
Moths of Asia